Manuel António Mendes dos Santos, CMF (born 20 March 1960) has been the Roman Catholic bishop of the Diocese of São Tomé and Príncipe since 1 December 2006.

Mendes was ordained a priest on June 13, 1985. He succeeded Abílio Rodas de Sousa Ribas, CSSp in the São Tomé and Príncipe see.

References

External links
Diocese of São Tomé and Príncipe, São Tomé and Príncipe
Biography in Portuguese

1960 births
Living people
São Tomé and Príncipe Roman Catholic bishops
21st-century Roman Catholic bishops in São Tomé and Príncipe
Roman Catholic bishops of São Tomé and Príncipe
Claretian bishops